Smokies may refer to:

 Great Smoky Mountains, a major mountain range in the southern part of the Appalachian Mountains, eastern United States
 Great Smoky Mountains National Park, a national park that preserves the respective mountain range
 Tennessee Smokies, a minor-league baseball team in Knoxville, Tennessee, United States
 Arbroath smokie, smoked fish made in a fishing town in Scotland

See also
 Smokie (disambiguation)
 Smoky (disambiguation)
 Smokey (disambiguation)